Oxie IF was a Swedish football club located in Oxie, Malmö Municipality.

Background

The club was affiliated to Skånes Fotbollförbund and made 8 appearances in the Svenska Cupen. On December 10, 2012 the club merged with BK Vången to form the new club Oxie SK.

Season to season

Footnotes

Football clubs in Skåne County
2012 disestablishments in Sweden
Association football clubs established in 1946
Association football clubs disestablished in 2012